Sandra Cervera Peris (Valencia, Spain, June 19, 1985) is a Spanish actress, presenter and singer known for her role in the soap opera, El secreto de Puente Viejo, where she played Emilia Ulloa for eight years.

Biography. 
Her beginnings were in Canal Nou with series such as Maniàtics, Socarrats, Check-In Hotel, all of them sitcoms with sketch episodes. In 2009 she was chosen to participate in 40, El Musical.

In 2011 she signed for the new daily series El secreto de Puente Viejo of Antena 3, playing Emilia Ulloa. That same year she also participates in an episode of Hospital Central. 

On September 22, 2012 she presented, along with Boro Peiró, the act of Selection of the Court of Honor of the fallas 2013.

In 2018 she left El secreto de Puente Viejo after 1,848 chapters and the departure of her character to France. A few months later she appears in an episode of Paquita Salas playing herself while doing her job on the set of El secreto de Puente Viejo. She also signs for Family Duo the new talent show of À Punt being one of the four members of the jury along with Sergio Alcover, Mari Giner and Carlos Marco.

In 2019 she returned again to El secreto de Puente Viejo for a few chapters, closing her participation in the series and joined the second season of Açò és un destarifo, sketches program of À Punt. In the summer of the same year she signed for the series Diumenge Paella, also on the Valencian channel, which premiered in January 2020 and undertook a first season of 13 episodes.

Filmography

Short films

Television

Television programs

Web series

Theater

Other work

References

External links 
 Sandra Cervera on IMDb

1985 births
Spanish television actresses
Living people